Podvinje may refer to:

 Podvinje, Visoko, a village near Visoko, Bosnia and Herzegovina
 Podvinje, Croatia, a village near Slavonski Brod, Croatia
 Podvinje cafe shooting, 1998
 Podvinje, Slovenia, a village near Brežice, Slovenia